Hans Martens (30 October 1911 – 6 June 1970) was a German athlete. He competed in the men's high jump at the 1936 Summer Olympics.

References

External links
 

1911 births
1970 deaths
Athletes (track and field) at the 1936 Summer Olympics
German male high jumpers
Olympic athletes of Germany
Place of birth missing